Audition is a 2005 Canadian comedy-drama film.

Written and directed by Luc Picard, the film stars Picard as Louis, an unhappy middle-aged repo man who decides to pursue his long-abandoned dream of becoming an actor. He quickly lines up an opportunity to audition for a role, and rehearses for his big day with actor Philippe Chevalier (Denis Bernard), while his girlfriend Suzie (Suzanne Clément) is preparing to leave him because she has just found out that she is pregnant but does not want her child to grow up in the atmosphere of violence created by Louis' current job.

The film was partially inspired by a letter Picard wrote to his four-year-old son Henri.

In 2009, it was reported that Picard had secured a deal to direct an English-language adaptation of L'Audition for an American film studio, although the film never materialized.

Awards
The film garnered seven Genie Award nominations at the 26th Genie Awards in 2006:
Best Actor: Luc Picard
Best Supporting Actor: Denis Bernard
Best Supporting Actress: Suzanne Clément
Best Director: Luc Picard
Best Original Screenplay: Luc Picard
Best Sound Editing: Olivier Calvert, Diane Boucher, Simon Meilleur, Francine Poirier and Jean-François Sauvé
Best Original Song: Daniel Bélanger ("Tourner")
Bernard won the award for Best Supporting Actor.

At the Jutra Awards in 2006, the film garnered ten nominations. Daniel Bélanger won the award for Best Song.

References

External links

2005 films
2005 comedy-drama films
Canadian comedy-drama films
Films directed by Luc Picard
French-language Canadian films
2000s Canadian films